John Paul Linville (January 2, 1943 – November 1, 2005) was an American stock car driver, who raced from 1982 until 1995 in the division that would become the NASCAR Xfinity Series. Throughout his career, Linville made 136 starts in the Xfinity Series where he finished in the top ten three times.

Racing career

Early career 
Linville began racing at the age of 20, when he entered a race at Bowman Gray Stadium with a car that he purchased for $99. He went on to win the Late Model Sportsman Division Championship at Bowman Gray Stadium in 1968, 1969, and 1971. Additionally, he won the 1970 Limited Sportsmen Championship at State Fairgrounds Speedway in Raleigh, NC.

National series 
In 1982, Linville made his NASCAR Budweiser Late Model Sportsman Series debut at Daytona International Speedway in the Goody's 300 at the age of 39. This was the inaugural race for what would become the NASCAR Xfinity Series. Linville finished 20th in his self-owned No. 62 Pontiac. He competed in a total of eight races during his Rookie campaign, with his best finish coming at Caraway Speedway, where he finished 11th. Overall, he finished 36th in points.

Linville went on to make several more appearances in the series running nearly full-time from 1983 through 1987. His career best finish came at Martinsville Speedway in the 1987 Nationwise 150, where he finished 8th. His top annual points performances came with a 17th-place finish in 1983, 1984, and 1986. His final race attempt came in 1995, when he attempted to qualify for a race at Myrtle Beach Speedway, but failed to do so. In total Linville competed in 136 races, finishing in the top ten, three times.

In addition to the Busch series, Linville attempted to qualify for two NASCAR Cup Series races, but failed to do so. He attempted to qualify for the 1988 Daytona 500 and the Miller Genuine Draft 500 in 1990. Both entries were in the No. 74 car owned by Bobby Wawak.

Linville's final professional race came in the ARCA Menards Series in September 1998 at Charlotte Motor Speedway. He finished 29th in the No. 90 Ford, owned by Ed Berrier.

Motorsports career results

NASCAR 
(key) (Bold – Pole position awarded by qualifying time. Italics – Pole position earned by points standings or practice time. * – Most laps led.)

Cup Series

Daytona 500

Busch Series

Later life 
Following his retirement from NASCAR, Linville worked as a general contractor at his self-owned business, Linville Home Builders, Inc., that he began in 1970. He also became involved in Kevin Harvick Incorporated, a race team co-owned by his daughter DeLana and her husband Kevin Harvick.

On November 1, 2005, Linville died after a battle with cancer.  He is buried in Eastlawn Gardens of Memory in Kernersville.

Family 
John Linville is the son of Ernest Paul Linville and Floy Phipps Linville, both originally from Forsyth County, North Carolina. He was one of nine children. His younger brother, Richard "Dickie" Linville, also raced in 52 Busch Series races from 1982 until 1986.

Linville married Joyce Griffin on October 14, 1966, at the age of 23. Together they had one daughter DeLana Harvick, who was born on July 7, 1973. DeLana is married to NASCAR Cup Series Champion Kevin Harvick.

References 

1943 births
2005 deaths
People from Kernersville, North Carolina
People from Forsyth County, North Carolina
NASCAR drivers
NASCAR team owners